Stephen Williamson (28 June 1827 – 16 June 1903) was a founder of the Liverpool shipping company Balfour Williamson & Co. and a Scottish Liberal Party politician.

He was born in Cellardyke, Fife in 1827, the son of Archibald Williamson, a shipowner.  In 1848 he went to Liverpool, and there founded, with Alexander Balfour, the firm of Balfour Williamson, trading with South America with offices in Valparaíso, Chile and San Francisco.  He married Anne Guthrie, the daughter of Dr Thomas Guthrie.

In 1880 he was elected to the House of Commons as Member of Parliament (MP) for St Andrews, a seat he held until 1885, and then represented Kilmarnock Burghs between 1886 and 1895.

Williamson had homes in Copley in Cheshire and Glenogil in Forfarshire.  He died at Copley in June 1903 aged 65. His son Archibald Williamson was also a politician and was created Baron Forres in 1922.

Notes

References 
Methil Heritage website
Kidd, Charles, Williamson, David (editors). Debrett's Peerage and Baronetage (1990 edition). New York: St Martin's Press, 1990,

External links 
 

1827 births
1903 deaths
Scottish Liberal Party MPs
Members of the Parliament of the United Kingdom for Scottish constituencies
Members of the Parliament of the United Kingdom for Fife constituencies
UK MPs 1880–1885
UK MPs 1886–1892
UK MPs 1892–1895
British businesspeople in shipping
19th-century British businesspeople